C/2014 Q2 (Lovejoy) is a long-period comet discovered on 17 August 2014 by Terry Lovejoy using a  Schmidt–Cassegrain telescope. It was discovered at apparent magnitude 15 in the southern constellation of Puppis. It is the fifth comet discovered by Terry Lovejoy. Its blue-green glow is the result of organic molecules (mostly Diatomic carbon) and water released by the comet fluorescing under the intense UV and optical light of the Sun as it passes through space.

History 
By December 2014, the comet had brightened to roughly magnitude 7.4, making it a small telescope and binoculars target. By mid-December, the comet was visible to the naked eye for experienced observers with dark skies and keen eyesight. On 28–29 December 2014, the comet passed 1/3° from globular cluster Messier 79. In January 2015, it brightened to roughly magnitude 4, and became one of the brightest comets located high in a dark sky since comet  (Hale-Bopp) in 1997. On 7 January 2015, the comet passed  from Earth. It crossed the celestial equator on 9 January 2015, becoming better seen from the Northern Hemisphere. At perihelion, its water production rate exceeded 20 metric tons per second.

C/2014 Q2 originated from the Oort cloud, but is not a dynamically new comet. After leaving the planetary region (epoch 2050), it will have an orbital period of about 8,000 years, with aphelion of about 800 AU.

The comet was observed to release 21 different organic molecules in gas, including ethanol and glycolaldehyde, a simple sugar. The presence of organic molecules suggests that they are preserved materials synthesized in the outskirts of the solar nebula or at earlier stages of the Solar System formation.

Gallery

References

External links 

 Two possible light curves (Alexandre Amorim)
 C/2014 Q2 (Lovejoy) images (Damian Peach)
 C/2014 Q2 (Lovejoy) at CometBase database

20140817
2014Q02
20150107
20140817
20150130